Guangchang may refer to the following locations in China:

 Guangchang County (广昌县), Fuzhou, Jiangxi
 Guangchang Subdistrict, Tangshan (广场街道), in Lunan District, Tangshan, Hebei
 Guangchang Subdistrict, Xiaogan (广场街道), in Xiaonan District, Xiaogan, Hubei
 Guangchang Subdistrict, Xiangtan (广场街道), in Yuhu District, Xiangtan, Hunan